Giulio Cesare Croce (1550–1609) was an Italian writer, actor/producer of cantastoria and enigma writer.

The son of a blacksmith and a blacksmith himself, after the death of his father, his uncle continued his cultural education. He never had any particular patron but was still able to gradually leave the family business to pursue his passion: story telling. He had an enormous success and was able to travel to fairs, markets, patrician houses, and the Italian courts. His presentations were complemented by a violin. His prolific literary production was contingent upon his own transcriptions of his shows.

He was married twice and had 14 children. He died in poverty.

His life and choices 

He had little formal training or teachers and can therefore be considered one of the most successful self-taught authors in Italian literature. Due to his choices, he was never fully part of the literary groups of his time.

To be a literary man in his period meant living at court, having patrons, or else being left to one's own devices for financial purposes. Croce was never a true literary man in the strictest sense of the word since he preferred laymen audiences to the court. In fact, he was principally a story teller and a blacksmith and most likely wrote for his own personal satisfaction. As such, his stories and inspiration come from the lower class, from the audiences at the market, who, if able to read, bought his works. This is in stark opposition to many contemporary authors who were inspired by the whims of their patrons.

Bertoldo 

One of the few of his more than 400 published works to be translated into English, Bertoldo was a popular story among the people of his time. Bertoldo is a story that had various versions in the Middle Ages taking place in the court of the king Alboin in either Verona or Pavia depending on the version. In its most organic version, that of Croce (1606), Bertoldo is from Roverè. Some of its raunchy language was softened, as was the edge of revenge against the powerful commoner in some of the other variations. One of his sources for the story were the  Dialogus Salomonis et Marcolphi.

To his first Bertoldo, Croce wrote a sequel called Le piacevoli et ridicolose simplicità di Bertoldino, 1608, (about the son of Bertoldo, in the charge of his mother Marcolfa). Later (1620), the abbot Adriano Banchieri wrote another sequel called Novella di Cacasenno, figliuolo del semplice Bertoldino. Since then the work of Croce is often published alongside under the title Bertoldo, Bertoldino e Cacasenno from which three films were inspired under the same title in: 1936, 1954 and 1984 (the last by Mario Monicelli).

In Bertoldo, Croce may have shown his secret aspirations, the crude lout and the self-taught, the presence at court was his hope for his future with which he hoped to solve his problems. The liberty of thought and action that Bertoldo had at court may show Croce's desire to live vicariously through his character by having a patron, like many of his counterparts, but without having to pay homage to them.

Books and Comedies 
He wrote more than 400 works in Italian and Bolognese dialect.

Books 
 Le sottilissime astuzie di Bertoldo
 Le piacevoli e ridicolose simplicità di Bertoldino, figlio del già astuto Bertoldo
 Descrizione della vita del Croce (autobiography in verse)
 I banchetti di mal cibati (on the plague of 1590)
 La sollecita e studiosa Accademia de' Golosi
 L'eccellenza e il trionfo del porco
 Le ventisette mascherate piacevolissime (dedicated to the venetian Berenice Gozzadina Gozadini)

Comedies 
 La Farinella
 Il tesoro
 Sandrone astuto
 Sandrone astuto
 Il tesoro
 Cavalcata di varij lenguazi
 Sogno del Zani
 Dispute fra Cola et Arlechino
 Dai Dialoghi curiosi
 Vanto ridicoloso del Trematerra
 La gran vittoria di Pedrolino contra il Dottor Gratiano Scatolone
 La canzone di Catarinon
 Vocabulario Gratianesco
 Conclusiones quinquaginta tres sustintà in Franculin dal macilent Signor Grazian Godga...
 Sbravate, razzate e arcibullate dell'arcibravo Smedolla uossi...
 Disputa fra Cola Sgariatore, ed Arlechino da Marcaria sopra le lor prodezze
 Utrom del Dottore Graziano Partesana da Francolino

References

External links 
 
 Da liber liber two texts by GC Croce: Bertoldo e La Farinella
 Bertoldo Bertoldino e Cacasenno pdf
 An enigma by GC Croce
 The pamphlets of Giulio Cesare Croce (Biblioteca dell'Archiginnasio) 
 Complete bibliography and transcription of some of the works of GC Croce 

1550 births
1609 deaths
People from San Giovanni in Persiceto
Italian dramatists and playwrights
Italian male dramatists and playwrights
16th-century storytellers